Kanchana 3 (marketed as Muni 4: Kanchana 3) is a 2019 Indian Tamil language action-comedy horror film co-produced, written and directed by Raghava Lawrence. The film stars Raghava Lawrence in a dual role with Oviya, Vedhika, Nikki Tamboli and Ri Djavi Alexandra. While Kovai Sarala, Soori, Tarun Arora, and Kabir Duhan Singh play supporting roles. Produced by Sun Pictures, the fourth installment in the Muni (film series), the film began production during October 2018 and released on 19 April 2019. Later, the film was dubbed in Hindi as K3: Kaali Ka Karishma.

Plot
Raghava, a ghost-fearing man, living with his happy family consisting of his mother, brother, sister in law, and their daughter, set out to Coimbatore for a family function. In the function, the whole family, including Raghava's female cousins Priya, Kavya, and Divya, witness strange and scary incidents at their grandparents' house, as well as Raghava getting possessed. The subsequent events return to another character named Kaali.

Past: Kaali is a social worker, who runs an ashram that gives shelter and food to the poor, and also contributed to the studies of aspiring youths. One day, a politician named Bhavani, the brother of the minister named Shankar enters Kaali's ashram. He asks to keep a sum of black money worth 100 crore in his ashram. He tells that he should return 80 crore and keep 20 crore as a source of funding to his ashram. 

However, Kaali refuses, which leads Bhavani to kill Kaali's handicapped innocents. Enraged, Kaali kills Bhavani and his henchmen and finally him. After learning this, Shankar and his assistant devises a plan to kill Kaali. When Rosie and Kaali take a ride on a bike, Shankar appoints two lorries and crushes them both. Rosie and Kaali die after watching the video of his ashram and his supporters getting destroyed in a fire accident orchestrated by Shankar.

Present: The possessed Raghava sets out to kill Shankar, but Shankar has already arranged exorcists to crush Kaali. Despite all this, Kaali surpasses the exorcists and kills Shankar, thus avenging his and Rosie's death. Kaali and Rosie safely return Raghava to his family and leave.

Cast

Raghava Lawrence in a dual role as Raghava and Kaali
Vedhika as Priya, Raghava's cousin
Oviya as Kavya, Raghava's cousin
Nikki Tamboli as Divya, Raghava's cousin
Ri Djavi Alexandra as Rosie, Kaali's love interest
Kovai Sarala as Raghava's mother
Devadarshini as Kamakshi, Raghava's sister-in-law
Soori as Govindan, Kaali's friend
Sriman as Raghava's brother
Delhi Ganesh as Raghava's grandfather
Tarun Arora as Minister Shankar
Kabir Duhan Singh as Bhavani, Shankar's brother
Anupama Kumar as Radha, Kaali's mother
Yuvasri Lakshmi as Pappa, Raghava's niece
Bhanu Balasubramaniam as Raghava's grandmother
Aathma Patrick as Murthy
Myna Nandhini as Durga 
Sunita Gogoi as Dhivya
Priyanka Nalkari as Moshika, Dhivya's sister
Ashok Pandian as Dhivya and Moshika's father
Meerabi as Dhivya and Moshika's mother
R. N. R. Manohar as Shankar's friend
Sampath Ram as Aghori
Ajay Ghosh as a corrupt cop
Chetan Pandit as Abhisekh
Gabrella Sellus

Production
Following the success of Kanchana 2 (2015), Raghava Lawrence confirmed that more films in the horror comedy series would continue to be made. In August 2015, he announced a film titled Naaga, which he would direct himself, and the film was widely reported to be the fourth film in the Muni series. He subsequently moved on to work on two other films, Motta Shiva Ketta Shiva (2017) and Shivalinga (2017).

Lawrence revived the project in August 2017 and revealed that he was finishing the script. The regular supporting cast of Kovai Sarala, Manobala, Sriman and Devadarshini were retained. Sun Pictures, who had recently produced who had previously produced Enthiran (2010), agreed to produce their film, marking their second production. In late September, the following actresses were added to the project: Oviya, following her popularity on the Tamil reality show Bigg Boss, Vedhika from the first film, and newcomer Nikki Tamboli.

The shoot of the film began in Chennai during the first week of October 2017. Nivetha Joseph was the costume designer for this film. The movie was released on Good Friday in 2019.

Music 
Raghava Lawrence selected Anirudh Ravichander to compose the music to this film. When he was unable to compose the music for this film, Lawrence signed a deal with DooPaaDoo.com which is owned by lyricist Madhan Karky. It was revealed that the film will have songs from six independent music directors throughout the DooPaaDoo.com platform, but later Raghava Lawrence unilaterally changed his stance to engage Saravedi Saran with 2 of the film's songs, while other songs will be composed by Sekar Sai Bharath, Jessie Samuel (who earlier sung one of the songs in the film Jarugandi), Bharath Madhusuthanan and the Sri Lankan duo of Raj Thillaiyampalam-Kapilan Kugavel. The background music was composed by Thaman, who earlier composed for director's previous Kanchana and Kanchana 2 film.

Reception 
Despite mixed to negative reviews, Kanchana 3 performed well at the box office. The film received negative reviews from audiences, with comparisons made between Kanchana & Kanchana 2. The dubbed Kannada version titled with the same name, and was panned by critics. 

Film Companion South wrote, "In theory, I am a fan of mixing humor and horror. I just wish they worked more on the writing. I can live with the non-existent craft in these films, but is it too much to ask a horror-comedy to have some quality horror and some quality comedy?"

Release
The movie was released on 19 April 2019.

References

External links
 
 Kanchana 3 on Sun Pictures

2019 films
2010s Tamil-language films
Films set in Canada
Films set in Chennai
Films set in Nepal
2019 action comedy films
2019 comedy horror films
Films shot in Canada
Films shot in Chennai
Films shot in Nepal
Films shot in the United Kingdom
Indian action comedy films
Indian comedy horror films
Indian sequel films
Indian films about revenge
Films scored by Thaman S
Films directed by Raghava Lawrence
Sun Pictures films